Rudolf Wittkower (22 June 1901 – 11 October 1971) was a British art historian specializing in Italian Renaissance and Baroque art and architecture, who spent much of his career in London, but was educated in Germany, and later moved to the United States. Despite having a British father who stayed in Germany after his studies, he was born and raised in Berlin.

Early life
Wittkower was born in Berlin to Henry Wittkower (1865–1942) and Gertrude Ansbach (Wittkower) (1876–1965).

Career
Rudolf Wittkower moved to London in 1933 with his wife Margot Holzmann because they were both Jewish and were fleeing Nazi Germany. He taught at the Warburg Institute, University of London  from 1934 to 1956, was appointed Durning Lawrence professor at the Slade School of Fine Art, University College, London in 1949 and then moved to the United States to work at Columbia University from 1956 to 1969 where he was chairman of the Department of Art History and Archaeology.

Among Wittkower's books were monographs on Bernini and Michelangelo, volumes in standard textbook series, and more individual subjects such as his Architectural Principles in the Age of Humanism, "his most significant book".  This introduced an in depth analysis of the Venetian architect Andrea Palladio and his relation to sixteenth century music theory. Part Four specifically deals with how and why Palladio adapted harmonic musical ratios and incorporated them into the physical proportions of his buildings. Although this theory of Palladian proportions was universally accepted after the book's release, recent works in art history have made it the subject of much controversy. Wittkower had encountered this notion that musical harmony may act in a manner analogous to visual harmony in Pythagoras, where it was also noted by Alberti.

Wittkower was elected to the American Academy of Arts and Sciences in 1959 and the American Philosophical Society in 1971. He was awarded the Alice Davis Hitchcock Award posthumously in 1975 for his book Gothic vs. Classic, Architectural Projects in Seventeenth-Century Italy.

Death and legacy
Wittkower died on 11 October 1971.

Selected publications
 Architectural Principles in the Age of Humanism (1949)
 Bernini: The Sculptor of the Roman Baroque (1955)
 The Arts in Western Europe: Italy in New Cambridge Modern History, vol. 1 (1957), pp. 127–53
 Art and Architecture in Italy, 1600–1750 (Penguin/Yale History of Art, 1958, and revised editions)
 Born Under Saturn: The Character and Conduct of Artists (1963, co-authored with Margot Wittkower)
 The Divine Michelangelo (1964, co-authored with Margot Wittkower)
 Gothic vs. Classic, Architectural Projects in Seventeenth-Century Italy (1974)
 Sculpture: Processes and Principles (1977, co-authored with Margot Wittkower)

Bibliography

Inline references

General references 

<li> 
        <li> Preprinted:  
<li> David Rosand. "Making Art History at Columbia: Meyer Schapiro and Rudolf Wittkower". Columbia Magazine.
<li> Howard, Deborah. "Four Centuries of Literature on Palladio", Journal of the Society of Architectural Historians, Vol. 39, No. 3 (October 1980), 224–241.

External links 
Henry Millon, “Architectural Principles in the Age of Humanism: Its Influence on the Development and Interpretation of Modern Architecture,” Journal of the Society of Architectural Historians 31, no. 2 (1972): 83–91.
 J. S. Ackerman, “Rudolf Wittkower’s Influence on the History of Architecture,” Source 8, no. 4, and 9, no. 1 (Summer/Fall 1989): 87–90.
 J. Montagu and J. Connors, “Rudolf Wittkower, 1901–1971,” in Art and Architecture in Italy 1600–1750 by R. Wittkower (New Haven, CT: Yale University Press, 1999), 1:ixff.
 U. Wendland, “Rudolf Wittkower,” Biographisches Handbuch deutschsprachiger Kunsthistoriker im Exil (Munich: Saur, 1999), 779–90.
 G. Romano, Storie dell’arte: Toesca, Longhi, Wittkower, Previtali (Rome: Donzelli, 1998), 65–92.
 Alina Payne, Rudolf Wittkower, 1994 and 2008; traduzione di Francesco Peri, Rudolf Wittkower, Torino, Bollati Boringhieri, 2011.
 Daniel Sherer, "Panofsky on Architecture: Iconology and the Interpretation of Built Form, 1915-1956," Part I, History of Humanities 5 (2019), 189ff: section 1: "Panofsky vs. Wittkower: Independence and Interdependence of Architecture in the Aesthetic Field."
 Finding aid to Rudolf Wittkower papers at Columbia University. Rare Book & Manuscript Library.

1901 births
1971 deaths
Writers from Berlin
German art historians
German architectural historians
German architecture writers
Academics of the Warburg Institute
Jewish emigrants from Nazi Germany to the United Kingdom
Academics of the Slade School of Fine Art
Columbia University faculty
Academics of the University of Cambridge
20th-century German historians
German male non-fiction writers
British art historians
German emigrants to the United States
Members of the American Philosophical Society